Albania is one of only two countries in the world (along with Paraguay) whose entire electricity production is dependent on hydroelectric power. It is host to five Hydroelectric power stations and a plant including the Fierza, Koman, Skavica and Vau i Dejës which are situated on the Drin river, due to its significant role for the production of electricity in the country. The Albanian Devoll Hydropower company is building two hydroelectricity plants on the Devoll river near Banjë and Moglicë. The two plants are expected to be completed in 2016 and 2018. After its completion, it will produce 729 GWh annually, increasing electricity production in Albania by almost 17%.

Albania presently has no nuclear power plants. In 2007 the government discussed constructing a nuclear power plant at Durrës. In addition to meeting the domestic energy demands, the plan foresaw electricity export to neighbouring Balkan countries and Italy via an underwater cable, which would link the Italian and Albanian electricity networks. In April 2009, Albania and Croatia announced a plan to jointly construct a 1,500 MWe nuclear power plant on the shores of Lake Skadar (Lake Shkodër), near Albania's border with Montenegro. As of 2016, Albania has no plans to build any nuclear power plants in the foreseeable future.

See also
Renewable energy in Albania

References

Industry in Albania
Electric power in Albania